Eugene Secunda, Ph.D. is a Fulbright Scholar and a member of the faculty in the Department of Media, Culture & Communication at New York University, where he has taught for 35 years. He is also an academic adviser in NYU's Gallatin School of Individualized Study. He previously served on the business school faculties of New York University, City University of New York and Adelphi University. Secunda was awarded New York University Teaching Excellence Awards in 2003 and 2018. He was awarded a Fulbright Scholarship Award to lecture at the University of Ljubljana in Slovenia in 2006. The co-author of Selling War to America: From the Spanish American War to the Global War on Terror and Shifting Time and Space: The Story of Videotape, He also has written articles for The Wall Street Journal, Los Angeles Times and New York Magazine, as well as for Advertising Age, Adweek and many other marketing communications publications. Among these articles are ones that have specifically addressed the theory and use of wartime propaganda. He has additionally authored articles that have been published in ten refereed academic journals. He was communications director for both the Campaign to Save Grand Central Station and the annual New York Cares Coat Drive.

Early life and career

Education 
Born in Brooklyn in 1934 to musician Sholom Secunda and Betty Secunda, Eugene Secunda was raised on New York's Lower East Side and in northern Manhattan. He earned his bachelor's degree in journalism at New York University in 1956, his master's degree in Communications at Boston University in 1962 and his Ph.D. in Media Studies at New York University in 1988. He served two tours of active duty in the U.S. Army. During that time, he was trained in propaganda at the U.S. Army Information School.

Career 
He began his career as a newspaper and radio reporter in the U.S., the Middle East and Europe, then was a police reporter for the New London Day newspaper, New London, Ct.  He later became a marketing executive promoting many Broadway theater productions, as well as for films at 20th Century Fox and Universal Film Studios, both in the U.S. and abroad.

Secunda was with the J. Walter Thompson Company for 16 years, supervising a variety of advertising and public relations accounts in the U.S. and global markets, and as J. Walter Thompson's Senior Vice President, Director of World-wide Corporate Communications. He also founded the agency's Entertainment Advertising Division. In 1980, he joined N. W. Ayer & Son International advertising agency in 1980 as Senior Vice President and Division Manager. He left in 1982 and co-founded his own agency, Barnum-Secunda Associates, where he served as President, and in 1985, established a consultancy, Secunda Marketing Communications, serving clients in the marketing and media industries.

In the 1990s, Dr Secunda was Director of Corporate Communications of Central European Media Enterprises, a London-based media company that launched and operated eight privately owned, advertiser-supported national television stations in Central and Eastern Europe reaching 100 million people.

Eugene Secunda still works as a Professor of Media Studies at New York University and continues his work in communications-related authorship and participation of community affairs.

Personal life 
He has lived in Greenwich Village, New York City with his wife Shirley for more than five decades and has two children, Ruthanne and Andrew.

Awards and affiliations

Professional awards 
 NYU Steinhardt Teaching Excellence Award, 2006 and 2018.
 Fulbright Scholar Lecturing Grant Award, University of Ljubljana, Slovenia, 2006.
 Lubin Scholarly Research Award, Pace University, for AA Survey of Senior Agency, Advertiser, and Media Executives on the Future of Advertising, Journal of Current Issues and Research in Advertising, 18, No. 1 (Spring), 1996, 1-19. (with Rob Ducoff and Dennis Sandler).

Publications

Books 

 Shifting Time & Space: The Story of Videotape, with Co-Author
 Selling War to America: From the Spanish American War to the Global War on Terror, with Co-Author

Chapters in books 

 Social and Cultural Aspects of VCR Use: An Historic Perspective
 Publicity Forum: Advice from 22 Experts

Academic journals 

 Journal of Current Issues and Research in Advertising: "A Survey of Senior Agency, Advertiser, and Media Executives on the Future of Advertising"
 Journal of Marketing Communications: "A Commentary on Marketers' Use of Disguised Forms of Product Promotion to Compensate for The Loss of Traditional Advertising's Effectiveness"
 The Journal of Product & Brand Management: "Brand Marketing: The First Private National Commercial TV Station in Central Europe"
 Journal of Media Planning: "How Advertisers View Network Television's Audience Erosion and Commercial Avoidance Problems: A Survey of Major Sponsors"
 Journal of Global Marketing: "Freedom of Choice and the Future of Latinobrand"
 Journal of Advertising Research: "Zipped TV Commercials Boost Prior Learning"
Journal of Media Planning: "Media Planning Concerns in a Blurred Editorial/Programming Environment"
Journal of Corporate Public Relations: "Why Advertising and Public Relations Aren't Friends: An Examination of the Enmity Between the Disciplines"
International Journal of Advertising: Consumer Attitudes Toward Product Placement in Movies: A Preliminary Study"

Professional publications 

 “Note From a JWT ‘Mad Man': Old Habits Die Hard,” Advertising Age, April 14, 2016
 "Make TV Milosevic's Worst Nightmare," Los Angeles Times, September 26, 1999.
 "...Should be Broadcast to Serbia," The Wall Street Journal, April 27, 1999.
 "Calvin Klein, Levi's ads? Well, that's show business," Advertising Age, October 9, 1995
 "On the Other Hand," Vancouver, September, 1995.
 "The rising expense of luring business," Advertising Age, March 13, 1995
 "Czech Republic's Nova station a guide for Eastern European TV," Electronic Media International, February 13, 1995.
 "Ad-editorial wall crumbling," Advertising Age, October 4, 1993.
 "Don't count premium brands out yet," Advertising Age, April 12, 1993.
 Infomercials on network?," Advertising Age, November 30, 1992.
 "Rx for pharmaceutical ads," Advertising Age, August 17, 1992. With co-author.
 Blurring the line at NBC," Advertising Age, November 25, 1991.
 "Is TV Addicted to Drug Company PR," Business and Society Review, Spring, 1990.
 "The Snack Pack," New York, August 29, 1988.
 "DAT's the Ticket," New York, March 7, 1988.
 “Notes From a JWT ‘Mad Man': Old Habits Die Hard,” Advertising Age, April 14, 2016.

Selective list of papers and lectures 
Between 1980–present, Dr. Secunda has given lectures or presented papers to the following organizations:

 "Managing Crisis Communications in the 21st Century," Austrian Advertising and Market Communication Association, Sponsored by the Austrian Trade Commission, May 14, 2002, New York, NY.
 “ Marketing Communications and the Global Perspective," Trans-Caucasus/Central Asian Marketing Communications Program, sponsored by the International Advertising Association, May 8-May 12, 2000, Tbilisi, Georgia.
 "Advertising and Constitutional Protections Around the World," a paper presented at the 2nd International Advertising Association Conference, Budapest, Hungary, September 7, 1999.
 "The Ethical Dilemma Confronting Public Relations Agencies," a paper presented at the 87th Annual Meeting of the Eastern Communication Association, April 26, 1996, New York, NY.
 "The Ethical Dilemma Confronting Public Relations Agencies," a paper presented at the 87th Annual Meeting of the Eastern Communication Association, April 26, 1996, New York, NY.
 Ethics in Public Relations Agencies: The Case of Hill & Knowlton," a paper presented at the annual conference of the New York State Speech Communication Association, October 15, 1995, Albany, NY.
 "After the Fall: The Central and Eastern Europe Environment for Advertising in the Post-Communist-Era (Focus on The Czech Republic), a paper presented at the annual conference of the American Academy of Advertising, March 24, 1995, Norfolk, VA.
 "Marketing a television station as a premium brand in the Czech Republic," a paper presented at the annual conference of the American Academy of Advertising, May 10, 1994, Tucson, AZ.
 "Marketing Opportunities in the Age of the New Order," a series of lectures presented to a select group of industrial representatives from the People's Republic of China, Queens College, (CUNY), November 2 and November 4, 1992, New York City.
 "Developments Affecting privately owned commercial television in Central and Eastern Europe," a paper presented at the International Communications Studies Program on "Emerging Broadcasting Capabilities in the former Soviet Union," Center for Strategic and International Studies, September 17, 1993, Washington, DC.
 "Freedom of Choice: Is it Available to the Latino Consumer?," a paper presented at the International Advertising Association International Symposium,"Advertising and the Media in an Open Society," May 11, 1992, Buenos Aires, Argentina; May 14, 1992, Caracas, Venezuela.
 A Media and Marketing Approaching the New Century: Trends in Media and Marketing For the 1990s and Beyond," participant in panel sponsored by American Marketing Association, New York Chapter, April 2, 1992, New York, NY (proceedings published in June 1992 issue of Marketing Review).
 "Viewing in a Distracted Environment," a paper presented at the Tenth Annual Advertising Research Foundation Electronic Media Workshop, December 4, 1991, New York, NY.
 "Marketing in America: An Overview," a paper presented at the Annual Conference of the Consumer Federation of America, October 24, 1991, Washington, DC.
 "A Public Relations Perspective of the Gulf War," a paper presented at the 49th annual convention of the New York State Speech Communication Association, October 19, 1991, Albany, NY.
 "How Geo-Political Changes Will Impact U.S. International Business," moderator and panelist, The 1991 Forbes Magazine Management Forum, June 28, 1991, Colorado Springs, CO.
 "The Multi-National Marketer's View of European Television," a paper presented at the Center for Strategic and International Studies conference,"The New European Satellite Smorgasbord: Dishing Up the Policies, Politics & Technologies of the 1990s, "June 25, 1991, Washington, DC.
 "Beyond 1992: Advertising/Marketing Implications for International Television Production and Programming," a paper delivered at the 40th Annual Conference of the International Communications Association, June 29, 1990, Dublin, Ireland.
 "Media Shakeout: Who Will Survive The 90's?," a paper presented at the Second Annual National Media Congress, November 15, 1989, New York, NY.
 "Is Television Advertising Losing It? An Analysis of the Impact of New Media Technologies on Advertising," a paper presented at the 47th annual conference of the New York State Speech Communication Association, October 14, 1989, Poughkeepsie, NY.
 "Video News Releases: The Hidden Persuaders Revisited?," paper presented at the 34th Annual Media Ecology Conference, October 8, 1989, Saugherties, NY.
 "Technology: What's Coming Up? What's Going Down?," a paper presented to the Tenth Annual Media Congress, January 23, 1989, New York, NY.
 "Programming for Video Beyond Cable," a paper presented to the Visual Communications Congress, June 9, 1983, New York, NY.
 "Networld: The Effects of Satellite Technology," a paper presented to the Fourth General Assembly Communication Congress, World Future Society, July 20, 1982, Washington, DC.
 "The Future of Global Satellite Television," a paper presented to the International Television Association, March 9, 1982, New York, NY.
 "New Developments in Entertainment and Leisure Advertising," a paper presented at the New School for Social Research, December 1, 1991, New York, NY.
 "Cable Television Advertising: Seven New Trends May Speed Its Progress," a paper presented at the Center for Communications, November 15, 1981, New York, NY.
 "Public Relations Today: Its Role in Society and Communications," a paper presented at the annual conference of the Columbia Scholastic Press Association, Columbia University, March 13, 1981, New York, NY.
 "The New Electronic Technologies: A Bird's Eye View of the Future," a paper presented to the 27th Annual Advertising Foundation Conference, February 25, 1981, New York, NY.
 "The Desensitization of America: A Media Analysis," a paper presented to the Federal Bureau of Investigation/Annul Police Chiefs Meeting, January 16, 1981, Arlington, VA.
 "Corporate Communications: Credibility or Chaos?," a paper presented to the National Investors Relations Institute, October 15, 1980.
 "The New Medium of the 80's: Fractured Television," a paper presented to the Annual Conference of American Advertising Federation, June 10, 1980, Dallas, TX.
 "Television in the 80's," a paper presented at the University of California (Los Angeles), February 23, 1980, Los Angeles, CA.
 "Movie Advertising on Cable and Satellite: It's Not a Dream," a paper presented to the Oakland Advertising Federation, February 19, 1980, Oakland, CA.

References 

1934 births
Living people
New York University faculty
Date of birth missing (living people)